In his political career, between the years 1938 and 1994, Harold Stassen, a Republican, ran many campaigns for public office. He was elected governor of Minnesota three times, in 1938, 1940, and 1942.

Stassen ran for Republican nomination for President of the United States in 1944, 1948, 1952, 1956, 1960, 1964, 1968, 1972, 1976, 1980, 1984, 1988, and 1992. His 1948 and 1952 campaigns saw him run competitively, whilst his other candidacy saw him make little impact, being regarded as a perennial candidate.

Stassen would run many unsuccessful campaigns for other public  offices. He twice ran unsuccessfully for governor of Pennsylvania, in Republican primary for Governor of Pennsylvania, 1958 and 1966. He ran unsuccessfully for mayor of Philadelphia in 1959. He twice ran unsuccessfully for United States Senate from Minnesota, in 1978 and 1994. He ran unsuccessfully for the Minnesota's 2nd district in the United States House of Representatives in 1986.

Gubernatorial

Minnesota
Minnesota gubernatorial election, 1938
 Harold Stassen (R) – 678,839 (59.92%)
 Elmer Austin Benson (Farmer-Labor) (inc.) – 387,263 (34.18%)
 Thomas F. Gallagher (D) – 65,875 (5.82%)
 John William Castle (Industrial) – 899 (0.08%)

Minnesota gubernatorial election, 1940
 Harold Stassen (R) (inc.) – 654,686 (52.06%)
 Hjalmar Petersen (Farmer-Labor) – 459,609 (36.55%)
 Edward Murphy (D) – 140,021 (11.14%)
 John William Castle (Industrial) – 3,175 (0.25%)

Minnesota gubernatorial election, 1942
 Harold Stassen (R) (inc.) – 409,800 (51.60%)
 Hjalmar Petersen (Farmer-Labor) – 299,917 (37.76%)
 John D. Sullivan (D) – 75,151 (9.46%)
 Martin Mackie (Communist) – 5,082 (0.64%)
 Harris A. Brandborg (Industrial) – 4,278 (0.54%)

Pennsylvania
Republican primary for Governor of Pennsylvania, 1958
 Arthur T. McGonigle – 578,286 (54.52%)
 Harold Stassen – 344,043 (32.44%)
 William S. Livengood – 138,284 (13.04%)

Republican primary for Governor of Pennsylvania, 1966
 Raymond P. Shafer – 835,768 (78.02%)
 Harold Stassen – 172,150 (16.07%)
 George J. Brett – 63,366 (5.92%)

Mayoral
Philadelphia mayoral election, 1959
 Richardson Dilworth (D) (inc.) – 438,278 (65.60%)
 Harold Stassen (R) – 229,818 (34.40%)

United States Senate
Republican primary for the United States Senate from Minnesota, 1978
 Rudy Boschwitz – 185,393 (86.81%)
 Harold Stassen – 28,170 (13.19%)

Republican primary for the United States Senate from Minnesota, 1994
 Rod Grams – 269,931 (58.17%)
 Joanell M. Dyrstad – 163,205 (35.17%)
 Harold Stassen – 22,430 (4.83%)
 John J. Zeleniak – 8,467 (1.83%)

United States House
Minnesota's 4th congressional district, 1986
 Bruce F. Vento (DFL) (inc.) – 112,662 (72.88%)
 Harold Stassen (R) – 41,926 (27.12%)

Presidential
1944 Republican presidential primaries
 Douglas MacArthur – 662,127 (28.94%)
 Earl Warren – 594,439 (25.99%)
 John W. Bricker – 366,444 (16.02%)
 Thomas E. Dewey – 278,727 (12.18%)
 W. Chapman Revercomb – 91,602 (4.00%)
 Unpledged – 87,834 (3.84%)
 Harold Stassen – 67,508 (2.95%)
 Riley A. Bender – 37,575 (1.64%)
 Charles A. Christopherson – 33,497 (1.46%)
 Wendell Willkie – 27,097 (1.19%)
 Joe H. Bottum – 22,135 (0.97%)
 Franklin D. Roosevelt (inc.) – 10,535 (0.46%)
 Edward Martin – 2,406 (0.11%)
 Everett Dirksen – 581 (0.03%)
 Others – 5,079 (0.22%)

1948 Republican presidential primaries
 Earl Warren – 771,295 (26.99%)
 Harold Stassen – 627,321 (21.96%)
 Robert A. Taft – 464,741 (16.27%)
 Thomas E. Dewey – 330,799 (11.58%)
 Riley A. Bender – 324,029 (11.34%)
 Douglas MacArthur – 87,839 (3.07%)
 Leverett Saltonstall – 72,191 (2.53%)
 Herbert E. Hitchcock – 45,463 (1.59%)
 Edward Martin – 45,072 (1.58%)
 Unpledged – 28,854 (1.01%)
 Arthur H. Vandenberg – 18,924 (0.66%)
 Dwight D. Eisenhower – 5,014 (0.18%)
 Harry S. Truman (inc.) – 4,907 (0.17%)
 Henry A. Wallace – 1,452 (0.05%)
 Joseph W. Martin – 974 (0.03%)
 Alfred Eastlack Driscoll – 44 (0.00%)
 Others – 5,939 (0.21%)

1948 Republican National Convention
 Thomas E. Dewey – 1,094 (60.74%)
 Robert A. Taft – 274 (15.21%)
 Harold Stassen – 157 (8.72%)
 Arthur H. Vandenberg – 62 (3.44%)
 Earl Warren – 59 (3.28%)
 Dwight Herbert Green – 56 (3.11%)
 Alfred Eastlack Driscoll – 35 (1.94%)
 Raymond E. Baldwin – 19 (1.06%)
 Joseph W. Martin – 18 (1.00%)
 Carroll Reece – 15 (0.83%)
 Douglas MacArthur – 11 (0.61%)
 Everett Dirksen – 1 (0.06%)

1952 Republican presidential primaries
 Robert A. Taft – 2,794,736 (35.84%)
 Dwight D. Eisenhower – 2,050,708 (26.30%)
 Earl Warren – 1,349,036 (17.30%)
 Harold Stassen – 881,702 (11.31%)
 Thomas H. Werdel – 521,110 (6.68%)
 George T. Mickelson – 63,879 (0.82%)
 Douglas MacArthur – 44,209 (0.57%)
 Grant A. Ritter – 26,208 (0.34%)
 Edward C. Slettedahl – 22,712 (0.29%)
 Riley A. Bender – 22,321 (0.29%)
 Mary E. Kenny – 10,411 (0.13%)
 Wayne L. Morse – 7,105 (0.09%)
 Perry J. Stearns – 2,925 (0.04%)
 William R. Schneider – 580 (0.01%)

1952 Republican National Convention (1st ballot)
 Dwight D. Eisenhower – 595
 Robert A. Taft – 500
 Earl Warren – 81
 Harold Stassen – 20
 Douglas MacArthur – 10

1964 Republican  presidential primaries
 Barry Goldwater – 2,267,079 (38.33%)
 Nelson Rockefeller – 1,304,204 (22.05%)
 James A. Rhodes – 615,754 (10.41%)
 Henry Cabot Lodge, Jr. – 386,661 (6.54%)
 John W. Byrnes – 299,612 (5.07%)
 William Scranton – 245,401 (4.15%)
 Margaret Chase Smith – 227,007 (3.84%)
 Richard Nixon – 197,212 (3.33%)
 Unpledged – 173,652 (2.94%)
 Harold Stassen – 114,083 (1.93%)

1968 Republican presidential primaries
 Ronald Reagan – 1,696,632 (37.93%)
 Richard Nixon – 1,679,443 (37.54%)
 James A. Rhodes – 614,492 (13.74%)
 Nelson Rockefeller – 164,340 (3.67%)
 Unpledged delegates – 140,639 (3.14%)
 Eugene McCarthy – 44,520 (1.00%)
 Harold Stassen – 31,655 (0.71%)
 John A. Volpe – 31,465 (0.70%)

1968 Republican National Convention (1st ballot)
 Richard Nixon – 692
 Nelson Rockefeller – 277
 Ronald Reagan – 182
 James A. Rhodes – 55
 George Romney – 50
 Clifford Case – 22
 Frank Carlson – 20
 Winthrop Rockefeller – 18
 Hiram Fong – 14
 Harold Stassen – 2
 John V. Lindsay – 1

1980 Republican presidential primaries
 Ronald Reagan – 7,709,793 (59.84%)
 George H. W. Bush – 3,070,033 (23.83%)
 John B. Anderson – 1,572,174 (12.20%)
 Howard Baker – 181,153 (1.41%)
 Phil Crane – 97,793 (0.76%)
 John B. Connally – 82,625 (0.64%)
 Unpledged delegates – 68,155 (0.53%)
 Ben Fernandez – 25,520 (0.20%)
 Harold Stassen – 25,425 (0.20%)
 Gerald Ford – 10,557 (0.08%)
 Bob Dole – 7,204 (0.06%)

1984 Republican presidential primaries
 Ronald Reagan (inc.) – 6,484,987 (98.78%)
 Unpledged delegates – 55,458 (0.85%)
 Harold Stassen – 12,749 (0.19%)

1988 Republican presidential primaries
 George H. W. Bush – 8,258,512 (67.91%)
 Bob Dole – 2,333,375 (19.19%)
 Pat Robertson – 1,097,446 (9.02%)
 Jack Kemp – 331,333 (2.72%)
 Unpledged – 56,990 (0.47%)
 Pete DuPont – 49,783 (0.41%)
 Alexander M. Haig – 26,619 (0.22%)
 Harold Stassen – 2,682 (0.02%)

1992 Republican presidential primaries
 George H. W. Bush (inc.) – 9,199,463 (72.84%)
 Pat Buchanan – 2,899,488 (22.96%)
 Unpledged delegates – 287,383 (2.28%)
 David Duke – 119,115 (0.94%)
 Ross Perot – 56,136 (0.44%)
 Pat Paulsen – 10,984 (0.09%)
 Maurice Horton – 9,637 (0.08%)
 Harold Stassen – 8,099 (0.06%)

References

Stassen, Harold
Stassen, Harold